Marti Stevens (born in New York City on August 15, 1928)  is a singer and actress. She has appeared in television shows such as It Takes a Thief, The Love Boat and Stagecoach West. She appeared in an Australian production of the play Forty Carats and in High Spirits, the musical version of Blithe Spirit, in London's West End in 1964. She also had a starring role in the 1962 film, All Night Long.

Early life
She is the daughter of American film studio executive, Nicholas Schenck. She was also a close friend of actresses Marlene Dietrich and Rachel Roberts. 

In 1963 she had a surprise visit from a queen. Queen Frederika and Princess Irene of Greece were being chased down the road by protestors and were ringing door bells looking for refuge. Marti Stevens heard the bell ring and came to the door dressed in a bath towel. She let them in and gave them both a scotch.

Music career

Clubs
In late November 1959, she began a two-week engagement at the Ankara club. It was reported in the Pittsburgh Post-Gazette, December 6 edition, she along with the Chandra Kaly Dancers were to stay on an extra week.

Other events
In January 2016, it was announced that she along with Barbara Cook, Tony winner Billy Porter, Lea Salonga, De'Adre Aziza, Amanda Green, Emmy Raver-Lampman, Lindsay Mendez, Rebecca Naomi Jones, Telly Leung and others were to perform at a benefit concert connected with the late Lena Horne. The event was to take place at New York City’s Symphony Space on Jan. 11 at 7:30 PM.

Stage
In March 1970, having been brought to Australia by Philip Productions, she was appearing at the Anthenaeum theater in Melbourne with Tony Hanlon in the James Burrows directed Forty Carats.

Film and television roles
In 1962, she had a role in the film All Night Long, a film with the British jazz-scene as its backdrop, based on Shakespeare's Othello. She played the role of Delia Lane, wife of a black musician, Aurelius Rex, played by Paul Harris. They become victim to the devious and sinister meddling by musician Johnny Cousin, played by Patrick McGoohan. Stevens sings two songs in the film.

Filmography

References

External links
 
 Marti's World, a picture of Ms Stevens in the Belgian magazine Piccolo

1928 births
Living people
American actresses
American people of Russian-Jewish descent
Jewish American actresses